Lisa V. Dempster is a Canadian politician, who was elected to the Newfoundland and Labrador House of Assembly in a by-election on June 25, 2013. She represents the district of Cartwright-L'Anse au Clair as a member of the Liberal Party.

A resident of Charlottetown, Labrador, Dempster has worked as an employment counsellor and as a municipal Councillor in Charlottetown, including serving as the town's deputy mayor. Dempster is a member of NunatuKavut.

After her re-election in the 2015 election, Dempster was named Deputy Speaker of the House of Assembly. She was promoted to Minister of Children, Seniors, and Social Development in a cabinet shuffle on July 31, 2017.

She was re-elected in the 2019 provincial election.

On August 19, 2020, Dempster was appointed Minister Responsible for the Status of Women and Minister of Indigenous Affairs and Reconciliation, Minister of Labrador Affairs, and Deputy Government House Leader in the Furey government.

She was re-elected in the 2021 provincial election.

Electoral record

References 

Year of birth missing
Women MHAs in Newfoundland and Labrador
Inuit from Newfoundland and Labrador
Liberal Party of Newfoundland and Labrador MHAs
Newfoundland and Labrador municipal councillors
Women municipal councillors in Canada
People from Labrador
21st-century Canadian politicians
21st-century Canadian women politicians
Women government ministers of Canada